Callington railway station was a railway station in the village of Kelly Bray,  north of the centre of the small town of Callington, Cornwall. It was the terminus of a branch line from Bere Alston, built by the Plymouth, Devonport and South Western Junction Railway, but operated by the London and South Western Railway. The station closed in 1966. The Tamar Valley Line still operates services from Bere Alston, with services terminating at Gunnislake railway station,  to the east of Callington.

The now-closed section of line north of Gunnislake was remote from local communities and provided a relatively slow journey compared with the competing roads, which limited its use. (Callington had good bus services to Saltash and Plymouth, but the landscape denied that to Gunnislake.) Ironically, the alignment and gradients of that part of the line were better than the surviving section south of Gunnislake. After closure the station was demolished and the site is now occupied by industrial units.

References

External links
 West Country Railway Archives - The Callington Branch

Disused railway stations in Cornwall
Former Plymouth, Devonport and South Western Junction Railway stations
Railway stations in Great Britain opened in 1908
Railway stations in Great Britain closed in 1966
Beeching closures in England
1908 establishments in England
Callington